Pärnamäe Cemetery is a cemetery in Pirita District, Tallinn, Estonia. Its area is 105.6 ha.

The cemetery was opened in 1962, and the cemetery was the merger of two former cemeteries. First burial took place in 1963.

In 1993, a crematorium (first in Estonia) was opened at the cemetery.

Burials
 Andres Ehin
 
 Enn Toona
 Konstantin Treffner
 Debora Vaarandi

References

External links
 

Cemeteries in Tallinn